The National Leadership Network for Health and Social Care (NLN), before 2005 the NHS Modernisation Board, is a coalition of stakeholders in the English National Health Service (NHS).

Its purpose is to advise the Ministerial team at the Department of Health on issues of NHS reform. There are twice-yearly meetings with the ministerial team  to review progress and set priorities. The Network has no executive power, but seeks to influence both government policy and the work of member organisations.

In April 2006 the Network issued a paper Strengthening local services: The Future of the acute hospital which considers the ways in which local acute hospitals will have to change and adapt given changes in the NHS as a whole.

References

External links
 NLN website

National Health Service (England)